Fernandezia is a genus of flowering plants from the orchid family, Orchidaceae. It contains about 30-40 species, native to northern South America, Central America, and southern Mexico.

Species accepted as of June 2014:

Fernandezia aurantiaca Senghas
Fernandezia aurorae (D.E.Benn. & Christenson) M.W.Chase
Fernandezia breviconnata (Schltr.) M.W.Chase
Fernandezia bryophyta (Schltr.) M.W.Chase
Fernandezia bucarasicae (Kraenzl.) M.W.Chase
Fernandezia capitata (Kraenzl.) M.W.Chase
Fernandezia cardenasii (L.B.Sm. & S.K.Harris) M.W.Chase
Fernandezia costaricensis (Ames & C.Schweinf.) M.W.Chase
Fernandezia crystallina (Lindl.) M.W.Chase
Fernandezia cuencae (Rchb.f.) M.W.Chase
Fernandezia cyrtophylla (Schltr.) M.W.Chase
Fernandezia dalstroemii (Dodson) M.W.Chase
Fernandezia debedoutii (P.Ortiz) M.W.Chase
Fernandezia denticulata Ruiz & Pav.
Fernandezia distichoides M.W.Chase
Fernandezia ecallosa (D.E.Benn. & Christenson) M.W.Chase
Fernandezia ecuadorensis (Dodson) M.W.Chase
Fernandezia falcifolia (Rchb.f.) M.W.Chase
Fernandezia favosifolia (Kraenzl.) M.W.Chase
Fernandezia gracillima (C.Schweinf.) M.W.Chase
Fernandezia hagsateri (Dodson) M.W.Chase
Fernandezia hartwegii (Rchb.f.) Garay & Dunst.
Fernandezia hispidula (Rchb.f.) M.W.Chase
Fernandezia ionanthera (Rchb.f. & Warsz.) Schltr.
Fernandezia lanceolata (L.O.Williams) Garay & Dunst.
Fernandezia lycopodioides (Schltr.) M.W.Chase
Fernandezia maculata Garay & Dunst.
Fernandezia mexicana (Dressler & Hágsater) M.W.Chase
Fernandezia micrangis (Schltr.) M.W.Chase
Fernandezia micrantha (Schltr.) M.W.Chase
Fernandezia minus (Schltr.) M.W.Chase
Fernandezia myrtillus (Rchb.f.) Garay & Dunst.
Fernandezia nigrosignata (Kraenzl.) Garay & Dunst.
Fernandezia nubivaga (L.O.Williams) M.W.Chase
Fernandezia parvifolia (Lindl.) M.W.Chase
Fernandezia pastii (Rchb.f.) M.W.Chase
Fernandezia pectinata (Rchb.f.) M.W.Chase
Fernandezia peperomioides (Kraenzl.) M.W.Chase
Fernandezia piesikii (Szlach., Mytnik & Rutk.) M.W.Chase
Fernandezia pseudodichaea (Rchb.f.) M.W.Chase
Fernandezia sanguinea (Lindl.) Garay & Dunst.
Fernandezia serra (Rchb.f.) M.W.Chase
Fernandezia squarrosa (Lindl.) M.W.Chase
Fernandezia stuebelii (Schltr.) M.W.Chase
Fernandezia subbiflora Ruiz & Pav.
Fernandezia tajacayaensis (D.E.Benn. & Christenson) M.W.Chase
Fernandezia tenuis (Schltr.) M.W.Chase
Fernandezia theodorii M.W.Chase
Fernandezia tica Mora-Ret. & García Castro
Fernandezia tortuosa (Foldats) M.W.Chase
Fernandezia vaginata (Schltr.) M.W.Chase

See also
 List of Orchidaceae genera

References

External links

Oncidiinae genera
Oncidiinae